The canton of Gordes is a French former administrative division in the department of Vaucluse and region Provence-Alpes-Côte d'Azur. It had 5,890 inhabitants (2012). It was disbanded following the French canton reorganisation which came into effect in March 2015. It consisted of 8 communes, which joined the canton of Apt in 2015.

Composition 
The communes in the canton of Gordes:
Beaumettes
Gordes
Goult
Joucas
Lioux
Murs
Roussillon
Saint-Pantaléon

References

Gordes
2015 disestablishments in France
States and territories disestablished in 2015